The Producers Guild of America Award for Best Episodic Comedy, also known as the Danny Thomas Award for Outstanding Producer of Episodic Television, Comedy, is an annual award given by the Producers Guild of America since 2000.

Previous PGA television awards
Prior to 2000, the award for outstanding producer of episodic television was not split into comedy and drama. Out of the eleven honored television programs, two were episodic comedies:
 1991: Brooklyn Bridge (CBS)
 1995: Frasier (NBC)

Winners and nominees

2000s

2010s

2020s

Total awards by network
 HBO – 6
 ABC – 5
 NBC – 5
 Amazon – 4
 FX – 2
 Apple TV+ – 1
 CBS – 1
 Netflix – 1
 Pop TV – 1

Total nominations by network
 HBO – 31
 NBC – 27
 ABC – 11
 Fox – 9
 CBS – 7
 FX – 6
 Amazon – 5
 Netflix – 5
 Showtime – 4
 HBO Max – 3
 Apple TV+ – 2
 Hulu – 2
 Pop – 2
 Comedy Central – 1

Programs with multiple awards
4 awards
 Modern Family (consecutive)

3 awards
 30 Rock (consecutive)
 Sex and the City (2 consecutive)

2 awards
 Curb Your Enthusiasm
 The Marvelous Mrs. Maisel (consecutive)

Programs with multiple nominations

9 nominations
 Curb Your Enthusiasm

7 nominations
 30 Rock
 Modern Family

6 nominations
 Veep

5 nominations
 Sex and the City
 The Office
 Will & Grace

4 nominations
 Arrested Development
 Entourage
 The Big Bang Theory

3 nominations
 Barry
 Malcolm in the Middle
 The Marvelous Mrs. Maisel
 Scrubs
 Silicon Valley
 Weeds

2 nominations
 Atlanta
 Everybody Loves Raymond
 Frasier
 Friends
 Glee
 Hacks
 Louie
 Only Murders in the Building 
 Schitt's Creek
 ''Ted Lasso

References

Episodic Comedy